Kappa Librae, Latinized from κ Librae, is the Bayer designation for a star system in the zodiac constellation of Libra. Its apparent visual magnitude is 4.72, so it can be seen with the naked eye. Its annual parallax shift is 10.57 mas, indicating it is roughly 310 light years away. It is 0.02 degree south of the ecliptic.

The star shows acceleration components in its proper motion, indicating with high probability that it is an astrometric binary. The visible component is an evolved K-type giant star with a stellar classification of K5 III. It is a suspected variable star with a brightness that ranges between 4.70 and 4.75. It radiates 296 times the solar luminosity from its outer atmosphere at an effective temperature of 3,930 K.

In Chinese astronomy, Kappa Librae is called 日, Pinyin: Rì, meaning Sun, because this star is marking itself and stand alone in Sun asterism, Room mansion (see : Chinese constellation).

References

K-type giants
Suspected variables
Libra (constellation)
Librae, Kappa
BD-19 4188
Librae, 43
139997
076880
5838
Astrometric binaries